Mike Caso (born July 13, 1984 in San Mateo, California) is an American soccer player, currently without a team.

Career

Youth and College
Caso attended Hart High School in Newhall, California, played club soccer for West Valley Samba, and played college soccer at the University of San Diego, scoring 22 goals in a four-year career with the Toreros, and being named to the All-WCC First Team as a junior.

Professional
Caso played extensively in the MLS Reserve Division, for both Los Angeles Galaxy and Columbus Crew, before being signed to a development contract by Galaxy in 2007. His first - and, to date, only - professional appearance came on August 26, 2007 during the Galaxy's 3-0 loss to the Colorado Rapids. He played the first 45 minutes of the game before being substituted out for Peter Vagenas.

References

External links
 USD profile

1984 births
Living people
American soccer players
University of San Diego alumni
LA Galaxy players
San Diego Toreros men's soccer players
Major League Soccer players
Association football midfielders
People from San Mateo, California